Mohammed Al-Marwani (born July 24, 1989, in Jeddah, Saudi Arabia) is a Saudi Arabian professional basketball player.  He currently plays for the Al-Ittihad Jeddah Sports Club of the Saudi Premier League.

He has been a member of Saudi Arabia's national basketball team.

External links
 Asia-basket.com Profile

References

1989 births
Living people
Saudi Arabian men's basketball players
Sportspeople from Jeddah
Centers (basketball)
Basketball players at the 2014 Asian Games
Asian Games competitors for Saudi Arabia
20th-century Saudi Arabian people
21st-century Saudi Arabian people